Dallis Flowers (born June 4, 1997) is an American football cornerback for the Indianapolis Colts of the National Football League (NFL). He played college football at Grand View and Pittsburg State.

Professional career

On April 30, 2022, Flowers signed with the Indianapolis Colts as an undrafted free agent, following the 2022 NFL Draft. He made the Colts' 53 man roster out of training camp.

References

External links
 Indianapolis Colts bio
 Pittsburg State Gorillas bio
 Grand View Vikings bio

1997 births
Living people
Players of American football from Chicago
American football cornerbacks
Pittsburg State Gorillas football players
Indianapolis Colts players
Grand View Vikings